Pascal Baillargeon (born February 19, 1986) is a former professional Canadian football offensive lineman. In the CFL’s Amateur Scouting Bureau December rankings, he was ranked as the 12th best player for players eligible in the 2011 CFL Draft. Baillargeon was drafted 21st overall by the Hamilton Tiger-Cats in the 2011 CFL Draft and after returning to Laval for 2011, he signed with Hamilton for the 2012 CFL season.  He was released by the Tiger-Cats on July 18, 2013 and signed with the Montreal Alouettes a week later. He played CIS football with the Laval Rouge et Or.

References

External links
Montreal Alouettes bio 

1986 births
Living people
Players of Canadian football from Quebec
Canadian football offensive linemen
Laval Rouge et Or football players
People from Chaudière-Appalaches
Hamilton Tiger-Cats players
Montreal Alouettes players